The Dogs is the self-titled debut album released by the rap group, The Dogs. It was released on March 28, 1990, through Joey Boy Records and was produced by the group's leader, Disco Rick. The album found mild success, peaking at #37 on the Top R&B/Hip-Hop Albums chart and featured the group's most well known song, "Crack Rock".

Track listing
"Intro"- 0:50 
"Where is Disco Rick At?"- 3:20 
"Lets Go, Lets Go"- 3:26 
"Fuck the President"- 3:29 
"Ten Little Niggers"- 4:31 
"Lick It"- 3:40 
"Take It Baby"- 4:07 
"Dog Call"- 4:47 
"Take It Off"- 4:10 
"Crack Rock"- 4:19 
"Who Gives a Fuck"- 3:23 
"Get Loose"- 4:34 
"Fuck You All"- 2:10

References

1990 debut albums
The Dogs albums